, often referred to as just Universal Music Japan or UMJ, is a Japanese subsidiary of the Universal Music Group founded in 1990. It is the largest subsidiary for a foreign company in the country regarding music distribution. The company is responsible for marketing and distribution in Japan for Japanese releases under Universal.

In 2021, Universal Japan CEO and President Naoshi Fujikura was included on Billboard's International Power Players list.

History

Early years 
The company was founded as PolyGram Co., Ltd. in 1990 with Koike Kazuhiko serving as president and CEO. In 1999, the company was restructured and renamed as Universal Music Co., Ltd.

2009–2013: Renaming to Universal Music LLC 
In 2009, the company was renamed as Universal Music LLC. Kazuhiko stepped down as CEO and Keiichi Ishizaka became CEO and president of the company.

2013–2014: Restructure following EMI purchase 
In 2011, EMI agreed to sell its recorded music operations to Universal Music Group for £1.2 billion ($1.9 billion) and its music publishing operations to a Sony-led consortium for $2.2 billion. Among the other companies that had competed for the recorded music business was Warner Music Group which was reported to have made a $2 billion bid. Universal Music Group completed their acquisition of EMI on September 28, 2012. In 2012, Ishizaka became CEO of EMI Music Japan while Universal Japan was scheduled to hold a corporate swap in response of the merger. EMI Music Japan officially was absorbed into Universal Japan, became defunct as a company with EMI Records Japan as a successor to the EMI Music Japan label. Nine months after the merger, Ishizaka stepped down from his position of CEO from Universal Japan, and became a non-executive chairman. His successor, Naoshi Fujikura was appointed in 2014. In April 2014, Universal Japan was once again restructured. Many of its labels were rebranded and split multiple times, including EMI Records Japan which de-merged into two sublabels EMI Records and Virgin Records of which the latter rebranded as EMI R and then merged with Delicious Deli Records to form Virgin Music.

2015–present: New business model, push for streaming and worldwide distribution 
In December 2015, Fujikura announced that Universal Japan "is a new business" and that the company would adopt a new business model to strengthen business. These changes were effective as of January 1, 2016. A new label, Universal-W was established in December 2015 with Japanese company Warlock.

In August 2016, Radwimps released the soundtrack for the 2016 Japanese animated film Your Name. The album was a commercial success in Japan and in a rare feat, charted in the United States in 2017. In December of the same year, Universal Japan acquired , a music management agency (founded in 1992), and made it a fully-owned subsidiary; as a result, the latter's "Augusta Records" label became an affiliated label of Universal Japan.

In 2017, the company announced it would relocate from Minato, Tokyo to the Jingumae Tower Building in Shibuya, Tokyo. The relocation took place from September 15, 2018, to October 9. In December 2017, Universal Japan announced they suspended the contract of Hilcrhyme member DJ Katsu following his arrest of possession of marijuana. He subsequently left the group following his arrest and the group lost their recording contract.

In June 2018, Universal Japan announced an exclusive license agreement with Disney Music Group.

In 2019, Universal Japan suspended the sales of Junnosuke Taguchi's discography and removed his releases from digital stores following his arrest of possession of marijuana.

In 2020, Universal launched the Virgin Music Label and Artist Services. The service provides artists with global solutions and was launched in many Universal subsidiaries, including Universal Japan.

In 2021, Yoshimoto Music signed a distribution deal with Universal Japan for future releases. In July 2021, CEO Fujikura was listed on Billboard's International Power Players list. In an interview with Billboard Japan, Fujikura shared about his measures on increasing streaming revenue and strategies to have Universal Japan artists chart overseas. Universal Japan has since released previous releases of former and current artists under their labels worldwide digitally, including Hikaru Utada, Crystal Kay, Radwimps, Mrs. Green Apple, Che'Nelle and Ai.

In 2022, Universal Japan CEO Fujikura was listed on Billboard's International Power Players list for a second year in a row. Fujikura became the first Japanese executive to appear on the list three times, including his first recognition in 2019. In an interview, Fujikura discussed plans for creating new marketplaces in Japan and developing them overseas, particularly in the United States. In September 2022, Travis Japan signed a record deal with Capitol Records, with distribution and marketing being handled by Universal Japan. In October 2022, following the success of Uta's Songs: One Piece Film Red, Ado signed a record deal with Geffen Records alongside her current record deal with Virgin Music.

In December 2022, Universal Japan announced an organization change, effective on January 1, 2023. Universal J, which was founded in 2002, was split into two labels, UJ and Polydor Records. Imprints from Universal J including Johnny's Universe and Top J Records were transferred to UJ. The company also announced Augusta Records would become an imprint of Universal Sigma.

Labels

Current labels 

 Polydor Records
 UJ
 Zen Music
 Universal Jazz
 Universal Sigma
 Lighthouse Music
 Universal D
 EMI Records
 Universal International
 Universal Gear
 Virgin Music
 USM Japan
 Augusta Records
 Universal Classics
 UM & Brands
 Def Jam Recordings
 Mercury Tokyo

Former labels 

 Delicious Deli Records
 EMI Records Japan
 EMI Music Japan
 Island Records
 Def Jam Japan
 EMI R
 Nayutawave Records
 Virgin Records
 Universal Victor
 Nippon Phonogram
 Mercury Music Entertainment
 Kitty Records
 Zero-A
 Far Eastern Tribe Records
 Universal-W
 Universal J

See also

List of record labels

References

External links 

 
 UMG History page
 
 
 
 

 
Record label distributors
1990 establishments in Japan